The Crinan Canal between Crinan and Ardrishaig in Argyll and Bute in the west of Scotland is operated by Scottish Canals. The canal, which opened in 1801, takes its name from the village of Crinan at its western end.

History
The canal was built to provide a short cut for commercial sailing and fishing vessels and later Clyde puffers to travel between the industrialised region around Glasgow to the West Highland villages and islands.  It was designed by civil engineer John Rennie and work started in 1794, but was not completed until 1801, two years later than planned. The canal's construction was beset with problems including finance and poor weather. Landowners demanded high prices for their land and navvies were reluctant to leave jobs in more accessible parts of England and Scotland. The construction cost £127,000.

On Saturday 8 August 1801, the Carlisle Journal reported that: 
On Monday, a boat laden with fish, arrived at the Broomielaw, Glasgow, from one of the Western Isles, being the first vessel that has passed through the Crinan Canal

The canal bank near Lochgilphead failed in 1805 and the canal's course was diverted to avoid the marshy ground. The canal's reservoirs were finished in 1809 but two years later a storm caused one to burst releasing its water and sending boulders and mud along the canal in both directions wrecking locks, the canal banks and the nearby roads. Repairs cost £8,000.

The canal company, headed by the Duke of Argyll, had to seek help from the government, who asked Thomas Telford to assess the problems. He suggested improvements to the locks, and some parts of the canal were redesigned including the swing bridges which were replaced in cast iron in 1816. The government paid for the work but the canal company lost control and it was handed to the Caledonian Canal Commissioners.

Queen Victoria travelled along the canal to Crinan during a holiday in the Scottish Highlands in 1847. She was greeted at Ardrishaig and her boat was towed by four horses, two of which were ridden by postilions in royal livery. At Crinan she boarded the royal yacht Victoria and Albert. Her journey made the canal a tourist attraction and gave the canal an added purpose. Passenger steamer companies operating out of Glasgow advertised the canal as the "Royal route" and by the late 1850s more than 40,000 passengers passed through Ardrishaig each year and were met by steamers to Oban at Crinan. 

A disaster occurred on 2 February 1859 when the Camloch reservoir supplying the canal burst, and the ensuing torrent of water and rock damaged the banks of the canal and seven of the gates forming the locks which were swept into the valley below. The canal was closed for through navigation until 1 May 1860 although the wider repairs to paths and road had not been completed. Although Parliament had authorised £12,000 for repairs the company reported that the expenditure had exceeded the budget by around £3,500 as the damage included large boulders of rock which were found in the bed of the canal.

In 1866 a steam-powered passenger boat Linnet replaced horse-drawn boats for tourists. Linnet remained in service until 1929.

Between 1930 and 1932, new sea locks were built at either end, making the canal accessible at any state of tide. The swing bridge at Ardrishaig was installed at this time. The canal became the responsibility of British Waterways in 1962. It closed for nine-week period in October 1987 to allow some refurbishment. On 2 July 2012 the British Waterways functions in Scotland were transferred to Scottish Canals.

Today the canal is a popular route for leisure craft between the Firth of Clyde and the west coast of Scotland, used by nearly 2,000 boats annually. The towpath is part of National Cycle Route 78, which links Campbeltown, Oban, Fort William and Inverness.

The canal is a two-part scheduled monument. Loch a' Bharain, which serves as a feeder reservoir for the canal, is also a scheduled monument.

Features 

The Crinan Canal has 15 locks and is crossed by seven bridges: six swing bridges and a retractable bridge. Stone for the 15 locks was brought from Mull, the Isle of Arran and Morvern.

The retractable bridge at Lock 11 replaced the original swing bridge in 1900. It is operated by a rotating handle and a cogged wheel which causes the bridge deck to roll forwards and backwards on rails and comes to rest across the lock chamber. The canal has towpaths on both sides from Ardrishaig to Crinan Bridge and horses assisted unpowered craft until 1959.

Popular culture

A song sung by Dan MacPhail in The Vital Spark:

See also

Canals of the United Kingdom
History of the British canal system

References

Notes

Bibliography

Further reading
Lindsey, Jean (1968) The Canals of Scotland, The Canals of the British Isles  8, Newton Abbot : David & Charles,

External links

 Scottish Canals: Crinan Canal
 Photographs of the Crinan Canal
images & map of mile markers seen along the Crinan Canal

Canals in Scotland
Buildings and structures in Argyll and Bute
Ship canals
1794 establishments in Scotland
Canals opened in 1801
Knapdale
Scottish Canals
Scheduled Ancient Monuments in Argyll and Bute